Spellfury is an action comedy web series. It is a "a comically low-budget fantasy series that gently mocks The Lord of the Rings genre with exploding monsters and bad wigs". Spellfury is a comedic fantasy adventure web series written and directed by Travis Gordon and stars Julie O'Halloran as Druinia. Each webisode of Spellfury comes out roughly every two months.

Synopsis
Season one of the webseries Spellfury focuses on the adventures of an elf named Druinia and a magic sword. Druinia is being hunted by an evil sorcerer named Kruskull who claims the sword is his. Druinia is on a quest to avenge her father's death.

Cast
 Julie O'Halloran as Druinia
 Penu Chalykoff as Kruskull
 Penu Chalykoff as Castle
 Ian Quick as Xorn
 Matt Ficner as Tarek
 Debra Ereaut as Velura 
 Travis Gordon as Bip
 Lisa Forrester as Davinika
 Brant Daniluk as Draka

Plot

Season 1 (2008–2010)

Season 2 (2011-2017)

Season 3 (2021)

Popularity
The Globe and Mail newspaper said that the webseries Spellfury has been watched 5 Million times.
The first episode of Spellfury has been watched 256,780 times on YouTube 
Owing to the number of views of the show, YouTube awarded Spellfury its own special show page.
As of June 20, 2010, Spellfury is the second most watched show on the Koldcast.tv network.
In May 2009 Wired.com reviewed Spellfury and in an article called "7 webotainers worth watching" mentioned "Canadian writer-director Travis Gordon throws World Of Warcraft video games, Lord of the Rings pomposity and Buffy The Vampire Slayer snark into the blender for this live-action series" 
The webseries was also reviewed by Tubefilter on July 8, 2009 in an article called "‘Spellfury’ is Low Budget, High Fantasy". Ain't It Cool News also reviewed the show as well. Spellfury the webseries (as of June 20, 2010) is the top rated show on the webseries directory Visioweb.tv.

Due to the popularity of the show a distribution deal was signed with David Samuels the owner of Koldcast.tv and has been airing there since August 4, 2009. David Samuels has said publicly that the Spellfury Series has over 200,000 views in 2010. In an interview with ScifiPulse writer Marx Pyle, Gordon said the series (as of April 2011) has over 3.5 million views.

Travis Gordon the writer/director of Spellfury won a Bronze for a Dramatic Short at the 2008 WorldFest-Houston International Film Festival for a short called Revelation.
You can find interviews with Mr. Gordon about Spellfury in 3 places, PopCultureMonster.com  who also reviewed it calling it "Magical, mystical and gripping", UberscifiGeek.com and Innsmouthfreepress.com.

A recent newspaper article (EMC Perth) on the evolution of the show and an interview with writer/director Travis Gordon called "Perth-based online show casts spell on viewers".

A video interview with Travis Gordon about Spellfury by the gamer site GenerationD20.

Spellfury on television
A condensed version of Spellfury season one (12 minutes) appeared on National Canadian TV (Global tv) in December 2011 on the JR Digs Show. It was mentioned in the Ottawa Citizen .
The portion of the show that had Spellfury in it is available to watch on YouTube.

Spellfury film short
A film short that combined episodes 1-3 of Spellfury with a new ending was submitted to the 2009 DragonCon Film Festival and is available to watch on IMDB (The Internet Movie Database).

Product placements
Spellfury Season 2 Episode 1 has a product placement for Coors Light, this is the first time they have done that in the series.
Characters in the medieval tavern scene are seen drinking Coors Light and the bartender pours a Coors Light for Mumsy (3:51-4:17) 
Spellfury Season 2 Episode 2 has a product placement for Hobgoblin Beer,a logo of Hobgoblin is found on all the barrels in the tavern scene also in the medieval tavern scene a big barbarian comes in and orders 2 Hobgoblins off of the Bartender Velura

See also
 List of Web television series

Spellfury can also be watched on iTunes, on Blip.tv, and the webseries directory Scifinal.

References

External links 
 

2008 web series debuts
Canadian comedy web series
YouTube original programming
Video podcasts
Fantasy web series
Web series featuring puppetry
Fantasy adventure web series